The Youngbloods is the debut self-titled studio album by the American rock band The Youngbloods, released in 1967. It was also reissued in 1971 under the title Get Together after the popular single from the album. The album peaked at number 131 on the Billboard 200 although two years later the single "Get Together" reached number five and sold more than a million copies.

History
"Get Together" was written by Chet Powers (aka Dino Valenti of Quicksilver Messenger Service) and had already appeared in 1963 on the album 12 String Guitar! Vol. 2  by The Folkswingers and in 1966 as a track on the first album by The Jefferson Airplane. Upon first release as a single by The Youngbloods in 1967, it only went to No. 62 in the pop charts. Two years later, after being featured in radio and television commercials, the track was re-released and climbed to number 5 in charts, selling more than a million records.

The first song on the album, "Grizzly Bear" (spelled "Grizzely Bear" on the album cover), was also released as a single reaching No. 52 on the pop charts in December 1966. Jerry Corbitt took credit for writing this song, but it had appeared on a 1928 recording by singer-songwriter Jim Jackson. The song featured the "jug band" style popularized by The Lovin' Spoonful, Jim Kweskin Jug Band and other similar groups of the middle 1960s. The title refers to a popular dance style of the 1910s. Corbitt also wrote the second song on the LP, the ballad "All Over the World (La La)". Side one also featured Blind Willie McTell's "Statesboro Blues" and another ballad, "One Note Man" written by fellow Cambridge folk musician Paul Arnoldi (spelled "Arnaldi" on the record label).

Side Two featured two more songs written by fellow folk singer-songwriters, Fred Neil's "The Other Side of This Life" and "Four in the Morning" by George "Robin" Remailly (who became a member of the Holy Modal Rounders in the 1970s).

Jesse Colin Young wrote two ballads on side two, "Tears Are Falling" and "Foolin' Around (The Waltz)" which alternates between 4/4 and 3/4 time signatures. Classical cello was added to "Foolin' Around" by George Ricci. Side two ends with two blues standards, Jimmy Reed's "Ain't That Lovin' You" and Mississippi John Hurt's "C.C. Rider". The last song featured a hard-rocking guitar jam that was common in the late 1960s, especially for San Francisco, which would soon become the Youngbloods' destination both geographically and musically.

Legacy

Richie Unterberger, in a retrospective review for Allmusic, feels "they would have been better off leaving the blues alone"; though he regards the rest of the material as "good" and calls the album an "engaging debut".

Track listing

Side one
 "Grizzly Bear" (Jerry Corbitt) – 2:20
 "All Over the World (La-La)" (Corbitt) – 3:13
 "Statesboro Blues" (Blind Willie McTell) – 2:18
 "Get Together" (Chet Powers) – 4:39
 "One Note Man" (Paul Arnoldi) – 2:24

Side two
 "The Other Side of This Life" (Fred Neil) – 2:28
 "Tears Are Falling" (Jesse Colin Young) – 2:25
 "Four in the Morning" (George Remailly) – 2:51
 "Foolin' Around (The Waltz)" (Young) – 2:50
 "Ain't That Lovin' You" (Jimmy Reed) – 2:39
 "C.C. Rider" (Mississippi John Hurt) – 2:37

Personnel
The Youngbloods
Jesse Colin Young – bass, lead vocals, rhythm guitar
Jerry Corbitt – rhythm guitar, backing vocals
Lowell "Banana" Levinger – lead guitar, electric piano
Joe Bauer – drums, percussion
with:
George Ricci – cello on "Foolin' Around"
Technical 
Felix Pappalardi – producer
Bob Cullen – recording supervision
Mike Moran – engineer
Mickey Crofford – engineer
Ray Hall – engineer

Charts

Singles

References

External links
VH1 Biography: The Youngbloods
Jesse Colin Young official homepage

1967 debut albums
The Youngbloods albums
Albums produced by Felix Pappalardi
RCA Records albums